Sanju Vala (b. 11 July 1960) is a Gujarati poet and critic of postmodernism from Gujarat, India. He authored more than 10 books and received numerous literary awards.

Early life 
Sanju Vala was born in Badhada (Savarkundla) village in Amreli district of Gujarat, to Naranbhai and Ranima. He completed his primary education from Badhada Primary School in 1976. He completed schooling in 1979 from J.V Modi Highschool, Savarkundla. He dropped out of college after studying for a year.

Career 
Sanju Vala joined the revenue department of the Government of Gujarat in 1979. He served as a member in working committee of Gujarati Sahitya Parishad from 2012 to 2014. He was a member of the working committee of Vali Gujarati Gazalkendra run by Gujarat Sahitya Akademi. He wrote columns for several newspapers, such as Janmabhoomi and Phulchhab. His poems were published in several literary magazines including Shabdasrishti, Parab, Sameepe, Etad, Parivesh, Navneet Samarpan and Gazalvishwa. As a poet, he organised and participated in mushairas, poet meetings and lectures on poetry appreciation and criticism. He has written poetry and its criticism. He has authored more than 10 books and received numerous literary awards.

Works 
Vala started his career writing ghazals and later ventured into other forms of poetry. His main contribution is towards Geet, ghazals and Achhandas (free verse poetry). Harish Meenashru and Manilal H. Patel appreciated his style of rhythm by commenting that his songs are path-breaking and fresh among age-old patterns of rhythm. At that time when most of the ghazal-poets used to write in straightforward and loud tones, he wrote against flow of predominant style of writing ghazals and established poetry with fresh language.

Recognition 

He was awarded the Jayant Pathak Poetry Award for his anthology kaik/kashunk/athava to in 1990. For his contribution in Gujarati ghazal poetry, he was awarded by Shayda Award in 1999. He received R.V Pathak/Nanalal Kavita Paritoshik in 2003 and Dr.Bhanuprasad Pandya Award for his anthology Ragadhinam in 2007 by Gujarati Sahitya Parishad, Darshak Sahitya Sanman-2014 by Vidhyaguru Ratilal Borisagar Sanskrutik Pratishthan, Kavishree Ramesh Parekh Sanman-2014 by Asmita Foundation, Rajkot and Harindra Dave Memorial Award in 2014.

Bibliography 
Kaik/Kashunk/Athava To... (collection of poems), 1990
Atikrami Te Gazal (gazals of poets from Rajkot), 1990
Kinshukalay (Compilation of ghazals of new generation)
Killebandhi (long poem and Freeverse), 2000
Ragadhinam (poem-songs), 2007
Ghar same sarovar (Collected poetry of Shyam Sadhu), 2009, Published by Gujarat Sahitya Akademi.
Kavitachayan-2007 (Selected Gujarati poems of 2007) published by Gujarati Sahitya Parishad.
Yaadno Rajyabhishek (Selected gazals of Shoonya Palanpuri), 2012, published by Gujarat Sahitya Akademi.
Manpanchamna Melama (Collected poetry of Ramesh Parekh), 2013, published by Gujarat Sahitya Akademi.
Kavita name sanjeevani (collection of gazals) 2014.

See also
 List of Gujarati-language writers

References

External links 
 

1960 births
Living people
Poets from Gujarat
Gujarati-language writers
20th-century Indian poets
Gujarati-language poets
People from Amreli district
21st-century Indian poets
Indian male poets
20th-century Indian male writers
21st-century Indian male writers